George McCall Courts (February 16, 1888 – August 1, 1932) was born in the District of Columbia. He graduated from the United States Naval Academy in 1907. He received the Medal of Honor for actions at the United States occupation of Veracruz, 1914.

Medal of Honor citation
Rank and organization: Lieutenant, Junior Grade Organization: U.S. Navy Born:16 February 1888, Washington, D.C. Accredited to: District of Columbia Date of issue: 12/04/1915

Citation:

For distinguished conduct in battle, engagements of Vera Cruz, 21 and 22 April 1914. Under fire, Lt.(j.g.) Courts was eminent and conspicuous in the performance of his duties. He had well qualified himself by thorough study during his years of duty in Mexico to deal with the conditions of this engagement, and his services were of great value. He twice volunteered and passed in an open boat through the zone of fire to convey important orders to the Chester, then under a severe fire.

See also

List of Medal of Honor recipients (Veracruz)
List of United States Naval Academy alumni (Medal of Honor)

References

External links

1888 births
1932 deaths
Burials at Arlington National Cemetery
United States Navy Medal of Honor recipients
United States Naval Academy alumni
Battle of Veracruz (1914) recipients of the Medal of Honor